James Lawrence Bartol (June 4, 1813 – June 23, 1887) was an American jurist who served as chief judge of the supreme court of the U.S. state of Maryland, the Court of Appeals.

Early life
James Lawrence Bartol was born on June 4, 1813, in Havre de Grace, Maryland to George Bartol. After graduating from Jefferson College in 1832, he studied law under the tutelage of Otho Scott, and was admitted to the bar in 1836.

From 1836 to 1843, Bartol engaged in law practice in Denton, Maryland, where he helped to establish an Academy. He also practiced law in Baltimore, Maryland, sometime after 1845. From 1857 to 1867, he served as Associate Judge of the Maryland Court of Appeals, and from 1867 to 1883 as Chief Judge.

Personal life
Bartol married a woman by the last name of Charbounier, with whom he had at least one daughter. Bartol died on June 23, 1887, in Baltimore. He was buried in Green Mount Cemetery in Baltimore.

References

External links

Chief Judges of the Maryland Court of Appeals
Washington & Jefferson College alumni
People from Havre de Grace, Maryland
Maryland lawyers
1813 births
1887 deaths
People from Denton, Maryland
19th-century American judges
19th-century American lawyers